A compression belt is a type of spinal brace worn around the waist and lower back that compresses the abdomen, centers the body's mass, and effectively decompresses the spine. As a result, the user experiences improved posture and core stability, lower back pain relief, and reduced spinal cord compression stress.

References

Orthopedic braces